The Caucus for Women in Statistics is a professional society for women in statistics. It was founded in 1971, following discussions in 1969 and 1970 at the annual meetings of the American Statistical Association, with Donna Brogan as its first president. The Governing Council is the main governing body of the Caucus.  The Council consists of the President, President-Elect, Past President, Past Past President, Executive Director (ex-officio), Treasurer, Secretary, Membership Chair, Program Committee Chair, Communications Committee Chair, Professional Development Committee Chair, Chair of Liaisons with other organizations and the Chair of Country Representatives. The President-Elect, President, Past President, Secretary, and Treasurer constitute the Executive Committee of the Governing Council. Caucus governance is described in the Constitution and Bylaws.

Purpose
The purpose of the Caucus is to assist in teaching, hiring, and advancing the careers of women in statistics, removing barriers to women in statistics,
encourage the application of statistics to women's issues,
and improve the representation of women in professional organizations for statisticians.  CWS envisions a world where women in the profession of statistics have equal opportunity and access to influence policies and decisions in workplaces, governments, and communities. The organization's mission is to advance the careers of women statisticians through advocacy, providing resources and learning opportunities, increasing their professional participation and visibility, and promoting and assessing research that impacts women statisticians.

Related organizations
An independent society, CWS works with all statistical professional societies, including the American Statistical Association (ASA), Institute of Mathematical Statistics (IMS), Statistical Society of Canada, (SSC), and International Statistical Institutes (ISI). For example, CWS has a close tie with the ASA and participates in the Joint Statistical Meetings (JSM), run by the ASA and cosponsored by IMS, SSC and other professional societies, where it is a sponsor of the Gertrude M. Cox Scholarship. The Caucus is a "sister organization" to the Association for Women in Mathematics, which was founded at the same time as the Caucus.

Activities
The Caucus publishes a newsletter and organizes events at major statistical meetings.
Since 2001, its activities have also included jointly sponsoring the Florence Nightingale David Award with the Committee of Presidents of Statistical Societies. This is "the only international award in statistical sciences ... that is restricted to women".

Leadership
The presidents of the Caucus have included:

1971–1973: Donna Brogan 
1974–1975: Marie Wann
1976: Joan R. Rosenblatt
1977: Barbara A. Bailar
1978: Janet L. Norwood
1979: Irene Montie
1980: Shirley Kallek
1981: Beatrice N. Vaccara
1982: Eileen Boardman
1983: Lee-Ann C. Hayek
1984: Jane F. Gentleman
1985: Nancy Gordon
1986: Arlene Ash
1987: Sandra K. McKenzie
1988: Jessica Utts
1989: Cynthia Clark
1990: Sue Leurgans
1991: Cyntha Struthers
1992: Stephanie Shipp
1993: Barbara Tilley
1994: Juliet Popper Shaffer
1995: Mary Batcher
1996: Pamela Doctor
1997: Sandra Stinnett
1998: Elizabeth Margosches
1999: Holly B. Shulman
2000: Janet Williams
2001: Nancy Allen
2002: Mari Palta
2003: Martha Aliaga
2004: Mariza de Andrade
2005: Julia Bienias
2006: Mary W. Gray
2007: Tena Katsaounis
2008–2009: Marcia Ciol
2010: Jennifer D. Parker
2011: Amanda L. Golbeck
2012: J. Lynn Palmer
2013: Susmita Datta
2014: Nancy Flournoy
2015: Paula Roberson
2016: Jiayang Sun
2017: Ji-Hyun Lee
2018: Shili Lin
2019: Nicole Lazar
2020: Wendy Lou
2021: Motomi Mori
2022: Nairanjana Dasgupta
2023: Dong-Yun Kim

References

External links

Mathematical societies
Organizations established in 1971
Women in mathematics
Organizations for women in science and technology
1971 establishments in the United States